Flight 812 could refer to several separate incidents that occurred on a flight with that designation.

 Air India Express Flight 812, a Boeing 737-800 which overshot the runway at Mangalore International Airport on May 22, 2010, killing 158 passengers and crew on board.
 Philippine Airlines Flight 812, an Airbus A330 which was hijacked just before landing. The hijacker robbed passengers and then parachuted out of the plane. His body was found, buried in mud, three days after the incident.
 Pan Am Flight 812, a Boeing 707 crashed into mountainous terrain whilst preparing to land in 1974, killing all 107 on board. The crash was found to be due to an instrument failure.
 Southwest Airlines Flight 812, a Boeing 737-300 which suffered structural failure of the fuselage in flight on 1 April 2011, leading to explosive decompression. A successful emergency landing was made.

0812